José Francisco Miranda  (born June 29, 1998) is a Puerto Rican professional baseball infielder for the Minnesota Twins of Major League Baseball (MLB). He made his MLB debut in 2022.

Career
Miranda was drafted by the Minnesota Twins in the second round of the 2016 Major League Baseball Draft out of Leadership Christian Academy in Guaynabo, Puerto Rico.  He made his professional debut that year with the Gulf Coast Twins.

Miranda played 2017 with the Elizabethton Twins, 2018 with the Cedar Rapids Kernels and Fort Myers Miracle and 2019 with Fort Myers and the Pensacola Blue Wahoos. He did not play a minor league game in 2020 since the season was cancelled due to the COVID-19 pandemic. Miranda started 2021 with the Wichita Wind Surge before being promoted to the St. Paul Saints. In his first game with the Saints, he hit three home runs. That year, Miranda won the Twins Minor League Player of the Year award. He was selected to the 40-man roster following the season on November 19, 2021.

He opened the 2022 season back with St. Paul. On May 2, 2022, Miranda was called up to the major leagues for the first time and made his MLB debut that night versus the Baltimore Orioles. On May 6, Miranda hit his first career home run off of Zach Logue of the Oakland Athletics.

Miranda won the rookie of the month in July where he had 13 runs, 24 hits, 2 doubles, 5 homeruns, and 19 RBI in 20 games played and slashed .353/.405/.603.

Miranda started a 3–6 triple play in the fourth inning on August 22 when Texas Rangers batter Nathaniel Lowe lined out to him.  Miranda then doubled Corey Seager on the first base bag and threw to shortstop Carlos Correa to put out Marcus Semien at second base.

Personal life
His cousin is actor and playwright Lin-Manuel Miranda.

See also

 List of Major League Baseball players from Puerto Rico

References

External links 

1998 births
Living people
People from Manatí, Puerto Rico
Major League Baseball players from Puerto Rico
Major League Baseball infielders
Minnesota Twins players
Gulf Coast Twins players
Elizabethton Twins players
Cedar Rapids Kernels players
Fort Myers Miracle players
Pensacola Blue Wahoos players
Wichita Wind Surge players
St. Paul Saints players
Criollos de Caguas players